Ali Afshari (born 1973 in Qazvin) is an Iranian activist.

For ten years, Afshari campaigned for reform-minded leaders and change within the Islamic Republic, with posts including membership on the Central Council of Office for Strengthening Unity and membership on the Central Council of the Islamic Student Association at the Amirkabir University of Technology, where he served as the secretary of the association for three years. He was a Reagan-Fascell Democracy Fellow at the National Endowment for Democracy.

Biography
From 1995 to 1999, Afshari was a member of the Central Council of the Islamic Student Association at Amirkabir University of Technology, serving as the Secretary of the Association. From 1999 to 2004, he was a member of the Central Council of the Office to Foster Unity National Islamic Student Association (Daftar- Tahkim-e Vahdat). From 1996 to 1997, Afshari was the coordinator of Khatami’s Student Political Campaign where he coordinated student activities and gatherings in support of Khatami’s presidential election nationally in 30 universities. From 2000 to 2003, he was imprisoned by the Islamic Republic of Iran for political crimes, including activities against national security. 400 of these days were spent in solitary confinement.

From 2000 to 2003, Afshari was arrested by the Islamic Republic on four occasions and imprisoned on charges that he was threatening the national security of the country through his role in pro-democracy programs on college campuses.  During this time, he served 400 days in solitary confinement, including 328 days consecutively. On May 16, 2001, following five months in detention and before being charged or brought to trial, he appeared on Iranian state television confessing to a plot to overthrow the Islamic Republic of Iran and apologizing to the Leader of the Islamic Republic, Ali Khamenei, for his mistakes.  This confession was broadcast across Iran and garnered attention from the public.

In 2008, in interviews with the Iran Human Rights Documentation Center, Afshari stated that he gave the confession after repeated beatings, threats of beatings, sleep deprivation and threats that his family would be harmed.

Advocacy
After completing his Masters of Science in Industrial Engineering at the Amirkabir University of Technology (Tehran Polytechnic) in 2004, Afshari has traveled to Ireland and the United States in an effort to divulge his views on the wrongdoings of the Iranian government. Afshari has published his views in over forty essays and papers including Roozonline, Gooya news and has been profiled by the BBC, Agence France Presse and The Irish Times.
  
On March 2, 2006, he and Akbar Atri gave talks on human rights and democracy in Iran at a panel discussion organized by Senator Rick Santorum and Senator Joe Lieberman at the U.S. Capitol. The event was sponsored by The Foundation for Defense of Democracies and the Iranian Students for Democracy and Human Rights. Their talk provided information on human rights abuses in Iran and detailed the progress of Iran ’s pro-democracy movement as well as the hurdles confronting it.

See also 
Human rights in Islamic Republic of Iran

References

External links 
The National Endowment for Democracy
Radio Farda report in Persian
BBC Persian report
Peiknet in Persian and English
Ali Afshari's weblog in persian
Ali Afshari's article archive 

Iranian activists
1973 births
Living people
Reagan-Fascell Democracy Fellows
Office for Strengthening Unity members